Louis of Anjou may refer to:
Louis of Toulouse, (1274–1297), cadet of the royal French house of Anjou and Catholic bishop
Louis I of Naples (1320–1362), husband of Joanna I of Naples
Louis I of Hungary (1326–1382), King of Hungary, Croatia, Dalmatia, Jerusalem, Sicily and Poland
Louis I of Anjou (1339–1384), Duke of Anjou, titular King of Naples
Louis II of Naples (1377–1417), rival of Ladislas as King of Naples
Louis III of Anjou (1403–1434), Duke of Anjou, titular King of Naples
Louis of Anjou, Marquis of Pont-à-Mousson (1427–1443)